David Nucifora (born 15 January 1962) is a rugby union former player, coach and performance director.

Playing career
Nucifora played for Queensland and Australia. He played as a hooker. He played for the Queensland team from 1986–1993 and was selected into the Wallabies in 1991 and was also a part of the 1991 Rugby World Cup winning squad which beat England in a nail-biting final winning 12–6.

Coaching and management career

Coach of the ACT Brumbies
In 2002 he was appointed as the coach of ACT Brumbies team and he took them to 3 consecutive finals series, including two finals, winning the 2004 Super 12 tournament. He was also named Australian coach of the year from 2002 to 2004 (3 years). In April 2004, he was sacked by the ACT Brumbies because the Brumbies' management believed that Nucifora introduced changes to the squad and the development of younger players, that his job was done and that the development program required another set of skills. As a result of this, Nucifora became the first ever coach in Super Rugby history, to be sacked after winning the title.

Move to the Blues
In 2005 he joined the Auckland Blues team as a technical advisor and high performance manager, with the positions previously held by former All Blacks coach Graham Henry. After Peter Sloane's four-year tenure as the head coach for the Blues ended, David was chosen as the new head coach for the team. This appointment was initially supported by fans but the team's inability to win and the loss of the high risk attacking rugby caused many fans to call for his immediate dismissal. Pat Lam took over this role in 2009.

Wallaby coaching aspirations
In late 2007 Nucifora applied for the role of Australian Head Coach. It was well known throughout this time that Crusaders coach Robbie Deans was the favourite of ARU CEO John O'Neill; however Deans applied for the All Blacks coaching role instead. Deans’ decision to apply for the All Blacks made Nucifora the front runner for the Wallabies post, but the NZRU controversially decided to keep incumbent coach Graham Henry despite the All Blacks worst ever performance at a world cup which led to Deans successfully applying for the Wallabies job. Despite Deans' appointment, Nucifora has insisted that he hasn't given up on coaching internationally one day.

Links to the Ireland job
On 20 March 2008 Eddie O'Sullivan resigned from his post as Irish rugby manager. Nucifora's name was connected as O'Sullivan's successor although he did not claim any interest in the job.

Joins ARU High Performance Unit
In 2009 Nucifora was appointed General Manager of the ARU High Performance Unit. He coached the Australian U20 team at the IRB Junior World Championship in Japan from 5–21 June 2009.

Irish Rugby Football Union High Performance Director
As of 1 June 2014 he is IRFU High Performance Director. He is known in Ireland for his role in ensuring the supply of elite players to the professional pool, be they sourced internally or externally. In his time with Ireland, the men's and women's 7s programmes were relaunched, with the men's team achieving some success at international level, qualifying for the 2020 Olympics. He has also been criticised for failing to foster more cohesive links between the professional game and the domestic and schools games in Ireland. In 2021 he was criticised in a letter from the Irish women's rugby team, citing loss of trust in the union, and historic and systemic failings.

References

External links
ARU Profile
Profile
Blues Coach
Nucifora for Assistant Role

1962 births
Living people
Australia international rugby union players
Australian people of Italian descent
Australian rugby union coaches
Australian rugby union players
ACT Brumbies coaches
Rugby union players from Brisbane